Mile Post 398 is a 2007 independent drama film written, directed and produced by Shonie and Andee De La Rosa, it is also the first featured film in cinema history that was written, produced, directed, filmed and starred in by an all-Navajo team. 

It was filmed almost entirely in Kayenta, Arizona, as well as in several other locations in the surrounding region, (Black Mesa, Chinle, Many Farms and Tsegi). It was an official selection of the American Indian Film Festival and Monument Valley Film Festival.

Plot
Taking place on the Navajo Nation, Cloyd Begay (Beau Benally), has been a victim of alcohol abuse and domestic violence throughout his childhood in result having him resorting to alcohol to repress his memories. As he is willing to take responsibility for his life and as husband and father, his drinking buddies Jimmy (Gerald Vandever) and Marty (James Junes) cultivate in having Cloyd continue their carefree lifestyle of drinking and partying, preventing him to change. All the while, his wife Lorraine (Kim White) and son Michael (KJ White) begin to lose hope in him and seriously consider leaving him. As the ensuing events unfold, it leads him to making life changing choice.

Cast

Awards

See also
 G, a documentary on methamphetamine use on the Navajo Nation, by the same filmmakers
 James & Ernie, a Navajo comedy duo

References

External links
 Mile Post 398 – 32nd American Indian Film Festival
 Mile Post 398 world premiere packs house in Kayenta
 Talking Stick Film Festival
 Newspaper Rock

2007 drama films
2007 films
American independent films
Navajo-language films
Films about Native Americans
Films set on the Navajo Nation
Films set in Arizona
Films shot in Arizona
American drama films
2007 independent films
2000s English-language films
2000s American films
2007 multilingual films
American multilingual films